station is a railway station in the  area of Berlin, Germany.

Overview

The two  lines are served by separate island platforms on different alignments, with the S1 platform at a lower level than the S7 platform. The two platforms are linked to each other, and to the station building, by walkways.

A flying junction to the west of the station keeps the main line segregated from the  lines.

References

External links

 Station information 

Berlin S-Bahn stations
Buildings and structures in Steglitz-Zehlendorf
Berlin Nikolassee